Chand Usmani (3 January 1933 – 26 November 1989) was an Indian actress in Hindi films from the 1950s to the late 1980s. She won the 1971 Filmfare Award for Best Supporting Actress. She is best remembered for playing self-sacrificing wives and mothers.

Biography
Chandbibi Khanam Usmani was born on 3 January 1933 in Agra, Uttar Pradesh, into a Pashtun family. She married Mukul Dutt (director of Aan Milo Sajna), with whom she had a son, Roshan. She ran a halfway house at her home in Mahim for runaway girls who had come to Mumbai seeking a career in films.  She died in Mumbai on 26 November 1989.

Career
Chand Usmani came to notice by participating in a talent contest called 'Kardar-Kolynos-Teresa Contest' in 1949, winning second place. In 1953, she debuted as the heroine in Jeewan Jyoti opposite Shammi Kapoor (his debut too). She also starred in Barati, Baap Re Baap and Samrat Prithviraj Chauhan, and had major roles in several other films, including Rangeen Raten, Naya Daur, Prem Patra and Pehchan. 
She received much critical acclaim: a review of Rangeen Raten (1956) said that she "gives a brilliant performance; hers is also the best developed character, and as a result she becomes the life and soul of the film." In Baap Re Baap, a key scene is noted for "the joy exhibited by Usmani on screen". The Film Heritage Foundation of India describes her as the "effervescent Chand Usmani, with her heart-warming smile". She won a Filmfare Award for Best Supporting Actress in 1971, for her portrayal of the character Champa, a prostitute, in the 1970 film Pehchan. Writing nearly 40 years later, The Hindu's film reviewer considered that "Chand Usmani does justice to Champa's role displaying restraint, poise and grace in a role which provided ample opportunity to easily go over the top." Despite having a long career, she said in an interview with Tabassum that she regretted not having an agent/manager, which led to her not getting diverse roles and not having more success. In many of her roles, she played a self-sacrificing wife, mother, girlfriend or sister, as summed up by Mahasweta Devi in her 1986 short story 'The Wet-Nurse':
"Jashoda was a true example of Indian womanhood. She was typical of a chaste and loving wife and devoted mother, ideals which defy intelligence and rational explanation, which involve sacrifice and dedication stretching the limits of imagination, and which have been kept alive in the popular Indian psyche through the ages, beginning with Sati-Savitri-Sita right down to Nirupa Roy and Chand Usmani in our times."

Filmography

References

External links 

1933 births
1989 deaths
Indian film actresses
Actresses from Uttar Pradesh
Indian people of Pashtun descent
Actresses in Hindi cinema
People from Agra
Filmfare Awards winners
20th-century Indian actresses